Kjetså is a village in Evje og Hornnes municipality in Agder county, Norway. The village is located on the western shore of the river Otra, just south of the villages of Hornnes and Dåsnesmoen.

References

Villages in Agder
Evje og Hornnes